Pierre Elliott Trudeau Public School may refer to the following schools in Canada:


British Columbia
 Pierre Elliott Trudeau Elementary School, Vancouver

Manitoba
 Collège Pierre-Elliott-Trudeau, Winnipeg

Ontario
 École élémentaire Pierre-Elliott-Trudeau, Toronto
 Pierre Elliott Trudeau French Immersion Public School, St. Thomas

Quebec
 Pierre Elliott Trudeau Public School (Blainville)
 Pierre Elliott Trudeau Public School (Gatineau)